Finn Hødnebø (December 29, 1919 – December 31, 2007) was a Norwegian philologist
and a lexicographer. He was most associated with his translations from Old Norse and Medieval Norwegian texts.

Finn Hødnebø was born in Søndeled, in Aust-Agder county, Norway. He graduated with the cand.philol. degree in 1948. He was Professor of Scandinavian Languages  at the University of Oslo (1972) and chair of the department of old Norwegian and the Norwegian, Norwegian Institute of lexicographical  (1985). His works with Old Norse and Medieval Norwegian texts included the work Corpus Codicum Norvegicorum Medii Aevi. He was the Norwegian editor of Kulturhistorisk leksikon for nordisk middelalder  (1955–1978).

He received the King's Medal of Merit in Gold (1993).

Selected works
The Viking Discovery of America, with Jónas Kristjánsson, editor, Elizabeth S. Seeberg, translator (1991)
Heimskringla: The Sagas of the Viking Kings of Norway, with  Knut A. Lie, editor, Lee M. Hollander, translator (1987)
 Ordforrådet i de eldste norske håndskrifter til ca. 1250, (1955)
 Kulturhistorisk leksikon for nordisk middelalder fra vikingetid til reformationstid (volumes 1-22, published 1956-77)
 Norges kongesagaer, with Hallvard Magerøy (1979)
 Norrøn ordbok, with Leiv Heggstad and Erik Simensen (1990)

References

1919 births
2007 deaths
Norwegian philologists
Norwegian lexicographers
Academic staff of the University of Oslo
People from Aust-Agder
Recipients of the King's Medal of Merit in gold
20th-century philologists
20th-century lexicographers